The Pittsburgh Steelers compete in the National Football League (NFL) as a member club of the American Football Conference (AFC) North division. Founded in 1933, the Steelers are the oldest franchise in the AFC; seven franchises in the National Football Conference (NFC) have longer tenures in the NFL. The team struggled to be competitive in its early history, posting winning records in just 8 of its first 39 seasons.  Since the AFL–NFL merger in 1970, however, it has appeared in eight Super Bowls and one of only two teams, along with the New England Patriots, to have won the Super Bowl six times. The six championships place the Steelers fourth in the league in terms of total championships (including those prior to the first Super Bowl), trailing only the Green Bay Packers (13 championships), the Chicago Bears (9) and the New York Giants (8). The club's 16 AFC Championship Game appearances are the most all-time and behind only the 49ers (17) for total conference championship game appearances.  In addition, they have hosted the second-most conference championship games (11) than any franchise in either conference, and are tied for second with the Dallas Cowboys and Denver Broncos with eight Super Bowl appearances; the Patriots currently hold the record of eleven appearances, as of 2021.

From  to  the franchise became the first NFL franchise to win four Super Bowl titles in six seasons, a feat which is yet to be matched. The Steelers are 6–2 in the Super Bowl, winning Super Bowls IX, X, XIII, XIV, XL and XLIII while losing Super Bowls XXX and XLV.

As of the 2021 season, the Steelers franchise are third all-time in playoff appearances, with 33, which is the most among active AFC franchises, as well as the most since the official start of the NFL-AFL merger in 1970.  The Cowboys (34) and Packers (35) are the only teams to have more playoff appearances. Coincidentally, these are also the only two teams to beat Pittsburgh in the Super Bowl. 

Notes:
The Finish, Wins, Losses, Ties and Pct columns include only regular season results. Postseason results are shown only within the "Playoffs" column.  Regular and postseason records are combined only at the bottom of the table.
 Tied for this position with at least one other team
 For the purposes of calculating winning percentage ties count as ½ win and ½ loss
 The Playoff Bowl (a.k.a. Bert Bell Benefit Bowl) is regarded as an unofficial post-season exhibition for third place
 Ranked by conference rather than division (strike shortened season).

References

Pittsburgh Steelers
 
seasons